United Township High School, also known as UTHS or UT, is a public four-year high school located in East Moline, Illinois, a city in Rock Island County, in the United States. The school is the only public high school in the city of East Moline, and is part of United Township High School District 30. UTHS is served by the feeder schools of East Moline School District #37, Silvis School District #34, Hampton School District #29, Carbon Cliff-Barstow School District #36, Colona School District #190 which provide elementary and middle school educations for the residents of East Moline, Silvis, Carbon Cliff, Barstow and Hampton in Rock Island County, and the city of Colona in Henry County.

Academics
United Township High School provides course work in the following academic departments:
 Area Career Center
 Business
 Driver Education
 Engineering
 English
 Family and Consumer Sciences
 Fine Arts
 Health
 Mathematics
 Modern Languages
 Physical Education
 Reading
 Science
 Social Studies

Area Career Center (ACC) programs
 Advanced Computer
 Applications
 Auto Mechanics
 Banking Internship
 Barbering
 Building Trades
 Child Care
 Collision Damage Repair
 Cosmetology
 Culinary Arts Internship
 Diesel Technician Internship
 Fire Science/Fire Fighting
 Health Occupations Co-op
 Interrelated Cooperative Education
 Law Enforcement and Public Safety
 Computer Integrated Machining
 Machine Trades Partnership
 Manufacturing Technology
 Marketing Education Co-op
 Office Occupations
 Pre-Engineering
 Travel and Tourism
 Web Page Design II
 Welding
 Woodworking

Athletics
United Township High School participates in the Illinois High School Association (IHSA) and is a member of the Western Big 6 Conference. The school fields teams in 13 IHSA sponsored athletics:
 Cross Country (boys/girls)
 Football (boys)
 Golf (boys/girls)
 Volleyball (girls)
 Basketball (boys/girls)
 Bowling (girls)
 Wrestling (boys)
 Baseball (boys)
 Softball (girls)
 Track & Field (boys/girls)
 Swimming & Diving (boys/girls)
 Soccer (boys/girls)

Conference championships

The accomplishments of the many UTHS Sports over years. The Boys' Track and Field Team has won the last 7 Western Big 6 conference titles. Wrestling held an 8-year conference winning streak. Girls' basketball 2008-09 season going undefeated 20-0.
 Boys' Track & Field (2008-2015)
 Wrestling (2000–2008)
 Basketball (2007–08
 Softball (2009–2010)
 Girls' Basketball (2008–2009) Record (20-0)
 Boys' Basketball (2007–08)
 Boys' Swimming (2008–09) Record (9-0) & (2009–10) Record (12-2)
 Girls' Tennis (2006–07)
 Boys' Soccer (1996-97, 1999-00, 2000-01, 2001-02, 2012-13)
 Girls' Soccer (2002-03, 2003-04)
 Baseball (2005)
 Cross Country (2011-2012)
 Football (1985)

State championships
At the conclusion of the 2009-2010 academic year, United Township High School has won 3 Illinois state titles in IHSA sponsored team athletics:
 Boys' Soccer (1999-2000 AA)
 Girls' Bowling (1990-1991 AA)
 Girls' Track & Field (1976–1977)

Activities
United Township High School provides activities both sponsored by IHSA, and not. UT won the IHSA sponsored Illinois state title for Drama in 1947-1948. The UTHS Marching Band has been successful in the Illinois State Marching Band Championships; they were champions of the 5A Field in 1996, 2000, 2001, and 2005, and they were champions of the 4A field in 2006 and 2007.   IHSA sponsored activities available to students include:
 Drama & Group Interpretation
 Music: Organization
 Music Solo & Ensemble
 Music: Instrumental

Other available activities include:
 Authentic Voices
 Breakfast Club
 Cheerleading
 Chess Club
 Crime Stoppers
 French Club
 Interact Club
 Key Club
 Marching Band
 Math Team
 National Honor Society
 Panther Players
 Pep Band
 Robotics Club
 Spanish National Honor Society
 Worldwide Youth in Science and Engineering (WYSE) Team
 YMCA Youth And Government

Notable alumni
 Mike Butcher: pitching coach for the Arizona Diamondbacks
 Spike O'Dell: WGN Radio broadcaster
 Ray Klingbiel: Chief Justice of Illinois
 Dean Stone: Former MLB pitcher; winning pitcher of the 1954 Major League Baseball All-Star Game

References

External links
 United Township High School
 Illinois High School Association (official site)

Public high schools in Illinois
East Moline, Illinois
Schools in Rock Island County, Illinois
1915 establishments in Illinois